Ungmennafélag Selfoss, commonly known as Selfoss or UMF Selfoss, is an Icelandic multisport club, located in the town of Selfoss in the Southern Region. In May 2019, the Selfoss men's handball team won the national handball championship for the first time. In August 2019, the women's football team added the club's second major title in one year when it won the Icelandic Football Cup.

History
Ungmennafélag Selfoss (English: Selfoss' Youth Club) was established on 1 June 1936, as a general sports club for young men and women under the name Ungmennafélagið Tíbrá. On 26 January 1937 its name was changed to Ungmennafélag Selfoss. Today, the club has departments for nine sports activities (gymnastics, athletics, team handball, judo, association football, weightlifting, swimming, taekwondo and motocross).

Basketball

Men's basketball

Notable players
 John Johnson
 Marvin Valdimarsson

Women's basketball
In 2006, a joint team of Hamar and Selfoss, called Hamar/Selfoss, won the second-tier 1. deild kvenna.

Titles
1. deild kvenna: 2006

Football

Men's football

The Selfoss men's football team has played in the top-tier Úrvalsdeild karla two times, during the 2010 and 2012 seasons, being relegated both times.

Titles
1. deild karla: 2009
2. deild karla: 1966, 1978, 1985, 1993

Current squad

Women's football

In August 2019, the Selfoss women's football team won its first major trophy when it defeated KR in the Icelandic Cup final.

Titles
Icelandic Cup: 2019

Handball

Men's handball

In 2019, the Selfoss men's handball team won it first Icelandic Championships title when they beat Haukar 3–1 in the championship finals series.

Titles
Icelandic champions: 2019
1. deild karla: 1998, 2001, 2010
2. deild karla: 1987

Women's handball

References

External links
Official home page: Selfoss.net

 
1936 establishments in Iceland